Viva Records is a Philippine record label owned by Viva Communications.

Current artists
 3 Daisy / Samahang Nozomi (DONGALO WRECKORDS)
 3YO
 Acapellago
 Adie (O/C Records)
 After 5
 ALAMAT
 Alexis Navarro
 ALLMO$T
 Amber
 Andrew E. (DONGALO WRECKORDS/Viva)
 Anja Aguilar
 Arthur Nery (O/C Records/Viva)
 Avon Rosales
 Ayanna Misola
 Bandang Lapis
 Basil Valdez (in cooperation with Vicor Music Corp.)
 Because
 BennyBunnyBand
 Billy Crawford (2018–present)
 Bita and the Botflies (O/C Records)
 Blaze N Kane
 Bugoy na Koykoy
 Caleb Santos
 Chasing Juan
 Color The Era
 Crazzy G (DONGALO WRECKORDS)
 Danita Paner
 Daryl Ong (2021–present)
 Davey Langit
 Dwin Araza
 Earl Generao (O/C Records)
 Fairgame
 Faith Cuneta
 Fig
 Freestyle
 Frizzle Anne (Anne Dimayuga) (O/C Records)
 Flow G (on behalf of Ex Battalion Music)
 Garage Morning (O/C Records)
 Gladys & the Boxers (now K & the Boxers)
 Half Life Half Death
Halo Halo Boys
 Halina (O/C Records)
Hambog ng Sagpro (Asero Records / Dongalo Wreckords)
 Happy Pill
 Janine Tenoso (2017–present)
 Janno Gibbs
 Jason Farol
 Jayann Bautista
 Jay Perillo
 Jem Cubil
 Jensen Kyra
 Jeffrey Garcia (on behalf of Vicor Music)
 John Roa (also known as JRoa) (on behalf of Ex Battalion Music)
 Juanita Romualdez
 Jude Pastor
 Karencitta
 Kean Cipriano (O/C Records)
 Kenaniah (O/C Records)
 Khen Magat
 Kim Molina
 Lahmeik Stacey
 Lara Cuevas
 Larry Marshall
 LITZ
 M-Gage
 Magnus Haven (Blacksheep Records Manila)
 Marion Aunor
 Mark Bautista (2003–present)
 Mark Carpio (2021-present)
 Matteo Guidicelli (2019–present)
 MC Kraine
 Michealangelo
 Miki Hahn
 Minzy (2020–present)
 MJ Cayabyab
 Monica Cuenco
 ND
 Nicole Omillo
 Nikki Bacolod
 Noel Milan
 Ntwine
 Pappel (O/C Records)
 Pio
 Protein Shake
 PUSAKALYE
 Rhymel
 Rice Lucido (O/C Records)
 Ryan Bang
 Sam Concepcion
 Sarah Geronimo (2003–present)
 Shehyee (Viva/FlipMusic Records)
 Sheila And The Insects
 Shy Carlos
 Sirkulo
 Sleep Alley
 Soapdish
 The Brownbeat All-Stars
 The Juans
 This Band
 True Faith
 Unique Salonga (O/C Records)
 U-Turn
 Valley Of Chrome
 Velcro
 Via Ortega
 Vino Bello
 VIVA Hot Babes
 VIVA Hotmen
 William Elvin (O/C Records)

Viva compilations 
 1st Levi Celerio Songwriting Contest Album
 18 Original Versions: Most Revival Songs
 20 Years Of Lite Rock (in collaboration with 96.3 WRock)
 A Dozen Alternatives (1994, Iba Music label)
 A Tribute To George Canseco
 A Viva Popstars Christmas
 Acoustic Night Live
 Acoustic Night Live 2
 Ayuz! Pinoy Alternative Powecuts
 Barangay Hip Hop
 Certified Superhits OPM
 Certified Superhits OPM Vol. 2
 Christmas on the Rocks (1994, Iba Music label)
 Closer To Home 1 (in collaboration with Crossover 105.1)
 Closer To Home 2 (in collaboration with Crossover 105.1)
 I Love You More
 Kanta, Tawa, Sayaw
 Laging Kitang Mamahalin: A Musical Tribute To National Artists
 Lite & Live At Tapika
 Lovestruck
 Lovestruck Vol. 2
 Lovestruck Vol. 3: The Promise
 Lovestruck Vol. 4
 Mother Of All
 No. 1 Signature Hits OPM's Best (in collaboration with Vicor Music Corp., 2008)
 OPM I Love
 Night Of The Champions
 Pasko Na Sinta Ko & Other Christmas Favorites
 Pinoy Soundtrip Vol. 1 (in collaboration with Vicor Music Corp.)
 Pinoy Soundtrip Vol. 2 (in collaboration with Vicor Music Corp.)
 Red Horse Beer Muziklaban Astig ng 2006
 Rok On!
 Senti 18 Pinoy Love Hits (in collaboration with Vicor Music Corp., 2008)
 Senti 2: More 18 Pinoy Love Hits (in collaboration with Vicor Music Corp., 2008)
 Senti 3 (in collaboration with Vicor Music Corp., 2009)
 Senti 4: It's Complicated (in collaboration with Vicor Music Corp., 2010)
 Servant Of All (1st Gospel Album of Viva Records)
 Servant Of All 2: In His Time
 Servant Of All Kids
 Songs of Faith, Hope and Inspiration
 Star For A Night
 The Best Of Crossover Presents (in collaboration with Crossover 105.1)
 The Best of Manila Sound: Hopia Mani Popcorn (in collaboration with Myx & GMA Network)
 The Best of Manila Sound 2: Hopia, Mani, Popcorn (in collaboration with JAM 88.3 & Magic 89.9)
 The Christmas Dance Party
 The Pearl Collection: Viva Music's 30th Anniversary Collection (2-CD)
 The Silver Series (25 Years of Viva Music)
Andrew E.
Janno
Sharon
Movie Themes of Sharon
Sharon Sings Canseco
Sharon Sings Valera
Vina
Freestyle
Wency
Willy
Regine
Movie Themes of Regine
Duets
Ogie
Jaya
Gary V. Duets
Donna
Kuh
Jun
Ivy
Pops
Ella May
Agot
Rico J.
Zsa Zsa
Pilita
Nonoy
Rivermaya
Gerry Paraiso
Tony Manigue
 Viva 20 Years Anniversary Album
 Witnessing To The Word

Former Viva Records artists 
4th Impact
A Dozen Alternatives
Afterimage (1996–2008)
Agot Isidro
Allona
Antoinette Taus
April Boy Regino
Advent Call
Blakdyak (1997–2007)
Blue Ketchup
Boys Will Be Boys
Charlie Green
Chiqui Pineda
Claire de la Fuente (2008–2010; deceased)
Denmark
DJ Alvaro
Dingdong Avanzado (2012–2013)
Donna Cruz (1990–2000)
Ella Mae Saison (1992–2000)
Ex Battalion (2018–2019)
Father & Sons
Freestyle
Gabby Eigenmann
Gary Valenciano
Gelli de Belen
H-Bom
Idelle Martinez
Imago (2003–2006; now under Universal Records)
Inertia
Itchyworms
Ivy Violan
Iya Villania (2008–2009; now under GMA Network)
Jam Disciples
James Reid (2012–2018; now under Careless)
Jawtee
Jaya (1996–2005)
Jeffrey Hidalgo 
Jennylyn Mercado (2010–2011; now under GMA Network)
Joel Trinidad 
Jolina Magdangal
Jun Polistico
Kamikazee
Lani Misalucha (1998–2004)
Maegan Aguilar
Mayonnaise
Melissa Gibbs
Miguel Vera
Mocha Girls
Nadine Lustre (2009–2017; now under Careless but still being managed by Viva Entertainment) 
Nina (2012–2016; returned to Warner Music Philippines)
Nonoy Zuñiga
Nora Aunor
Nyoy Volante
Ogie Alcasid (2001–2007; now under Star Music; catalog of his releases now handled by Viva Music Publishing)
Passage
Pat Castillo
Patricia Javier
Prettier than Pink
Pops Fernandez (1999–2005)
Rapasia
Rachelle Ann Go (2004–2015; now under Cornerstone)
 Raffi Quijano
Ramon "RJ" Jacinto
Randy Santiago
Raymond Manalo
Rea Valle
 Regine Velasquez-Alcasid (1986–1989, 1997–2006, 2017–2020)
Rica Peralejo (1999–2002)
Rico J. Puno (deceased)
Rivermaya (2001–2007)
Roselle Nava (2004–2014)
Rockstar
Rockstar 2
Quamo
Salbakuta
Shamrock
Sharon Cuneta (now under Star Music)
Side A
Soapdish
The Company
The Boss
Toni Daya
Tony Lambino
Vanna Vanna (formerly FOJ; disbanded)
Velcro
Victor Wood
Vina Morales
Wency Cornejo
Willie Revillame (2010–2013)
XLR8 (2010–2012)
Yamani
Zsa Zsa Padilla (in cooperation with Vicor Music Corp.)
Zyrene Parsad

Viva soundtracks 
 Laging Naroon Ka OST
 Campus Girls OST
 Forever OST
 Love Notes The Movie OST
 Okey si Ma'am OST (1995)
 Pangarap Na Bituin (Philippine TV soundtrack) (in collaboration with Star Music)
 T.G.I.S. The Movie Soundtrack
 Till I Met You OST
 Muling Umawit ang Puso OST
 Pangarap Ko Ang Ibigin ka OST
 Darna OST
 S2pid Luv OST
 Weyt A Minit, Kapeng Mainit OST
 Humanap Ka ng Panget OST
 Kahit Konting Pagtingin OST
 Minsan Pa: Kahit Konting Pagtingin 2 OST
 Maging Sino Ka Man OST
 Kailangan Ko'y Ikaw OST
 Megamol OST
 Kaputol ng Isang Awit OST
 Tusong Twosome OST (2001)
 Sa Huling Paghihintay OST (2001)
 Pangako Ikaw lang OST
 Banyo Queen OST
 Annie B. OST (2004)
 Masikip sa Dibdib OST (2004)
 Can This Be Love OST (under license of ABS-CBN)
 Bituing Walang Ningning OST (2006; in collaboration with Star Music)
 Paano Kita Iibigin OST (2007)
 Diary Ng Panget OST
 ABNKKBSNPLAko? The Movie OST
 Sid & Aya OST (2018)
 Kahit Ayaw Mo Na OST (2018)
 My Bakit List OST
 Unforgettable OST (2019)
 Indak OST
 Never Not Love You OST

Gallery

References

External links
 

 
Philippine record labels
Pop record labels
Companies based in Pasig